Inezgane is the capital of Inezgane-Aït Melloul Prefecture located on the north bank of the Sous River, about  south of Agadir, on the Atlantic Ocean coast of Morocco. It is in some ways a suburb to the larger Agadir, but unlike the tourism-centered Agadir, Inezgane is a typical Moroccan/Berber city. Located where the N1, N8 and N10 highways meet, Inezgane is an important transport hub in the region of Souss-Massa. 

Inezgane is well known for its souks and silver jewellery, as well as for its vegetable, fruit, and spice market. Tuesday is the main market day, when people come from all the villages nearby to sell their goods and buy provisions for the week.

The name Inezgan might be derived from the Amazigh word ⴰⵏⵣⵉⴳ-ⴰⵏ French Anzig-an meaning "The cave" or "That cave", as there were and are caves in this area.
Inezgane is the second economic pol in Morocco

Notable people 
Aicha Tachinouite, Moroccan singer.

References

Populated places in Inezgane-Aït Melloul Prefecture
Cities in Morocco
Municipalities of Morocco
Prefecturial capitals in Morocco